Sandsøya or Sandsøy is an island in Harstad Municipality in Troms og Finnmark county, Norway. The  island lies east of the island of Grytøya and southeast of the island of Bjarkøya. The highest point on the island is the  mountain Veten. In 2017, Sandsøya had 91 inhabitants.

The island settlement is a very old trading post and church village, a part of the former municipality of Bjarkøy which existed until 2013. Sandsøy Church is located on the western side of the island in the village of Sandsøy. The other village on the island is Slakstad on the eastern part of the island.

There was a ferry link that formerly went between Altevik on Sandsøya, Fenes on Grytøya, and Austnes on Bjarkøya. The Bjarkøy Fixed Link replaced the ferry routes linked Sandsøya and Grytøya with a bridge and linked Grytøya and Bjarkøya with an undersea tunnel. The bridge and tunnel will open in late 2018.  There is also a connection by the Hurtigruten boat from Sandsøya to Harstad, Austnes, and Senja.

See also
List of islands of Norway

References

Bjarkøy
Harstad
Islands of Troms og Finnmark